Talmudic law is the law that is derived from the Talmud based on the teachings of the Talmudic Sages. 
 See Talmud or Talmudical Hermeneutics for more information.

External links
The Institute of American and Talmudic Law 

Talmud
Legal concepts
Legal systems